Drew Pyne is an American football quarterback who is expected to play for Arizona State University in the 2023 season. He previously played for the Notre Dame Fighting Irish before entering the NCAA transfer portal in 2022.

Early life high school career
Pyne was born on December 5, 2000, in New Caanan, Connecticut. He attended and played high school football for New Canaan High School in New Canaan. As a senior, he completed 161 of 252 passes for 2,107 yards and 24 touchdowns. He was selected to play in the 2020 Under Armour All-American Game. Pyne committed to the University of Notre Dame to play college football.

College career

Notre Dame 
Pyne played in four games as a backup to Ian Book his first year at Notre Dame in 2020. He completed two of three passes for 12 yards. As a sophomore in 2021, he was played in two games as a backup to Jack Coan, completing 15 of 30 passes for 224 yards with two touchdowns. Pyne competed with Tyler Buchner to take over as the team's starting quarterback in 2022. Buchner won the job; however, Pyne took over as the starter after Buchner suffered a season-ending injury during the team's second game of the season. On December 2, 2022, Pyne entered the transfer portal.

Arizona State 
On December 19, Pyne announced he would transfer to Arizona State.

Statistics

References

External links
Notre Dame Fighting Irish bio

Living people
Players of American football from Connecticut
American football quarterbacks
Notre Dame Fighting Irish football players
2001 births
Arizona State Sun Devils football players